Ashley Hunter may refer to:

 Ashley Hunter (cartoonist), 1854–1932, New Zealand cartoonist and engineer
 Ashley Hunter (footballer), b. 1995, British footballer

See also
 Ash Hunter, actor